Elizabeth Ann Van Duyne (born November 16, 1970) is an American politician serving as the U.S. representative for Texas's 24th congressional district. A member of the Republican Party, she was mayor of Irving from 2011 to 2017. She was an official in the U.S. Department of Housing and Urban Development during the Trump administration.

Early life and education
Van Duyne was born in upstate New York and lived in Amsterdam, New York, until she was seven years old and later lived in Cooperstown. In 1986, her family moved to Irving, Texas. She graduated from Greenhill School in Addison, Texas. She also graduated from Cornell University, magna cum laude, where she earned a Bachelor of Arts in city and regional planning, government, and law.

Career 

Van Duyne became dissatisfied with Herbert Gears, the Democratic Irving city councillor representing her, over how he handled a zoning case in her neighborhood. She ran against Gears in the 2004 election, and won. Gears was elected mayor in 2005. Van Duyne stepped down from the council in 2010, and successfully ran for mayor against Gears in the 2011 election. She defeated Gears in a rematch in 2014.

In 2015, following an article by Breitbart News that made a false allegation that a court in the Dallas–Fort Worth metroplex followed sharia law, Van Duyne pushed for a vote on a resolution in the Irving City Council that expressed support of a bill in the Texas Legislature seeking to ban sharia law. Also in 2015, when Ahmed Mohamed, a 14-year-old Muslim boy, was arrested for bringing a homemade clock, which teachers thought was a bomb, to school, Van Duyne defended the school's and the Irving Police Department's actions. She was named as a co-defendant in a defamation lawsuit initiated by Mohamed's father. Van Duyne was dismissed from the suit, based partially on the Texas Citizens Participation Act, a state law that "prohibits the use of lawsuits to intimidate or silence citizens and public officials from exercising their right of free speech." The entire suit was eventually dismissed by the judge, who ruled the plaintiffs had failed to prove officials discriminated against Mohamed.

In February 2017, Van Duyne announced she would not seek a third term as mayor. In May 2017, President Donald Trump appointed Van Duyne as a regional administrator for the United States Department of Housing and Urban Development (HUD), overseeing Texas, Oklahoma, New Mexico, Louisiana, and Arkansas.

U.S. House of Representatives

Elections

2020 

After Kenny Marchant announced in August 2019 that he would not seek reelection to the United States House of Representatives, Van Duyne resigned from HUD so that she could run to succeed Marchant in representing , a suburban stretch between Dallas and Fort Worth, including parts of Denton, Dallas, and Tarrant counties. She received Trump's endorsement in early 2020 and won the Republican primary on March 3, defeating four rivals with about 65% of the vote.

In the general election, Van Duyne faced the Democratic nominee, Candace Valenzuela, a former Carrollton-Farmers Branch school board member. Van Duyne opposed the Affordable Care Act, saying it "has done profound damage to the healthcare of Americans." During the campaign, she ran advertisements in which she said she would protect laws that require preexisting conditions to be covered by insurance. During the campaign, Valenzuela criticized Van Duyne for holding events where she did not wear a face mask and did not socially distance, in contradiction to public health guidance at the time. Van Duyne called Valenzuela a "coward" for not campaigning in person amid the pandemic. Van Duyne praised the Trump administration's handling of the pandemic. On criminal justice reform, Van Duyne stated her opposition to ending cash bail. The Atlantic has described Van Duyne as "the new face of Trumpism in Texas."

On November 3, Van Duyne defeated Valenzuela, 48.8% to 47.5%, even as Democratic presidential nominee Joe Biden carried the district by 5 points. According to the Dallas Morning News, Van Duyne focused on public safety and the economy during the campaign. During the campaign, approximately $7.6 million was spent on advertisements against Van Duyne and $7.9 million on advertisements against Valenzuela.

Tenure 
Van Duyne is one of 147 Republican lawmakers who voted to overturn results in the 2020 presidential election by objecting to Pennsylvania's electors on January 7, 2021.

Van Duyne's district was competitive in the 2020 elections, but redistricting maps released by Republicans in 2021 shift the lean of her district to the right by nearly 20 points, making it non-competitive. The proposed maps would draw her 2020 challenger's home out of the district.

Committee assignments 

 Committee on Transportation and Infrastructure
 Subcommittee on Aviation
 Subcommittee on Highways and Transit
 Subcommittee on Economic Development, Public Buildings and Emergency Management
 Committee on Small Business
 Subcommittee on Oversight, Investigations and Regulations (Ranking Member)
 Subcommittee on Economic Growth, Tax and Capital Access
 Select Committee on the Modernization of Congress

Caucus memberships
 Republican Governance Group

Personal life 
Van Duyne met her former husband, Chris "Casey" Wallach, while they were attending Cornell University. They have two children, and divorced in 2012 after being married for 17 years.

In February 2021, a man committed suicide by firearm outside of Van Duyne's home in Irving. The man was identified as Richard Christian Dillard, a former communications staffer for Van Duyne's 2020 House campaign.

Van Duyne is an Episcopalian.

Electoral history

See also
Women in the United States House of Representatives

References

External links

 Representative Beth Van Duyne official U.S. House website
 Campaign website

 
 

|-

1970 births
Living people
21st-century American politicians
Businesspeople from Texas
Candidates in the 2020 United States elections
Cornell University alumni
Female members of the United States House of Representatives
Christians from Texas
People from Amsterdam, New York
People from Irving, Texas
Protestants from Texas
Republican Party members of the United States House of Representatives from Texas
Trump administration personnel
United States Department of Housing and Urban Development officials
Women mayors of places in Texas
21st-century American women politicians
American Episcopalians
Episcopalians from Texas